Lucifer is a 2007 South Korean television series starring Uhm Tae-woong, Ju Ji-hoon, and Shin Min-a. It aired on KBS2 from March 21 to May 24, 2007 on Wednesdays and Thursdays at 21:55 for 20 episodes.

The series is the second installment of the revenge trilogy by director Park Chan-hong and writer Kim Ji-woo, after Resurrection in 2005 and followed by Shark in 2013.

Plot
A string of murders brings together a conflicted detective, a psychic librarian, and a mysterious lawyer with dubious motives. Detective Kang Oh-soo (Uhm Tae-woong) is assigned to two seemingly unrelated murder cases, where the only clues left behind are tarot cards, with the first card meaning "judgment." This leads him to Seo Hae-in (Shin Min-a), a quiet librarian who has the uncanny ability to make a psychic connection to an object to discover its history. She reveals to him that the victims were connected to the death of a high school boy years ago. The one common link between the suspects is their defense attorney, Oh Seung-ha (Ju Ji-hoon), a young lawyer who is seemingly kind and altruistic. Hae-in and Seung-ha later fall in love, though Oh-soo also has feelings for her.

As the culprit continues to leave clues, more lives are ruined and the body count rises. Oh-soo races to uncover the truth, but he is also haunted by the sins of his past which he has been trying to atone for. An incident in his youth 12 years ago has snowballed into a larger tragedy, and the two men involved are destined to face each other again, unsure who is good and who is evil.

Cast

Main
 Uhm Tae-woong as Kang Oh-soo
 Seo Jun-young as young Oh-soo
A 29-years old detective who works in the violent crimes division. He is energetic, brave, relentless in his duties, and a straight talker. Oh-soo comes from a rich family and is the second son of a famous politician. During his middle school years, he was considered a troublemaker and a bully. At 17, he stabbed a fellow student to death during an argument. To atone, he turned away from his dark past.
 Ju Ji-hoon as Oh Seung-ha/Jung Tae-sung
 Kwak Jung-wook as young Tae-seung
A 28-years old public defender. Known for his kindness, Seung-ha frequently volunteers at a soup kitchen, and always listens intently to his client's problems and suggests solutions. 12 years ago, his life changed after the death of his older brother, followed shortly by his mother's death due to shock and grief. He disappeared after graduating from middle school, and resurfaces as a lawyer. While hiding his real identity, he meticulously prepares for revenge.
 Shin Min-a as Seo Hae-in
 Ko Joo-yeon as young Hae-in
A 24-years old librarian who possesses an ability for psychometry and is knowledgeable about tarot cards. Bright and optimistic, she lives with her widowed mother, who is deaf and mute. Hae-in learned about her supernatural ability when she was 12 years old.

Supporting
Kang Oh-soo's family
 Jung Dong-hwan as Kang Dong-hyun, Oh-soo's father
 Choi Deok-moon as Kang Hee-soo, Oh-soo's older brother
 Yoon Hye-kyung as Choi Na-hee, Hee-soo's wife

Kang Oh-soo's friends
 Kim Young-jae as Na Seok-jin, Hee-soo's assistant and Na-hee's lover
 Han Jung-soo as Yoon Dae-shik, private money lender
 Oh Yong as Kim Soon-ki, ex-prison inmate

Police detectives
 Joo Jin-mo as Ban Chang-ho, chief detective
 Greena Park as Lee Min-jae
 Kim Young-joon as Shin Jae-min

Supporting cast
 Jo Jae-wan as Kim Young-chul
 Lee Bo-hee as Yeo Soon-ok, Hae-in's mother
 Lee Eun as Gong Joo-hee, Hae-in's best friend
 Kim Kyu-chul as Cha Gwang-doo, lawyer and former detective
 Im Seung-dae as Hwang Soo-geon
 Park Kwang-jung as Mo In-ho
 Yoo Yeon-soo as Jo Dong-seob
 Kim Kyung-ik as Sung Joon-pyo, reporter

Extended cast
 Lee Min-hee as lost girl
 Lee Do-ryun as Gwan Hyun-tae
 Jeon Ye-seo as Oh Seung-hee, Seung-ha's sister
 Park Chul-ho as Jung Tae-hoon, Tae-seung's older brother
 Choi Jae-hwan
 Lee Sung-min as Hwang Dae-pil
 Kim Min-kyu
 Oh Hyun-chul
 Park Young-seo as the real Oh Seung-ha

Ratings

Source: TNS Media Korea

Awards and nominations

Remake

Lucifer became very popular in Japan when it aired on cable channel So-net in October 2007. This led to the production of a Japanese remake in 2008 titled Maō, starring Satoshi Ohno, Toma Ikuta, and Ryoko Kobayashi.

References

External links
  
 
 
 

Korean Broadcasting System television dramas
2007 South Korean television series debuts
2007 South Korean television series endings
Korean-language television shows
South Korean suspense television series
South Korean thriller television series
South Korean television series remade in other languages